Robert Fulton is a marble sculpture depicting the American engineer and inventor of the same name by Howard Roberts, installed at the United States Capitol's National Statuary Hall, in Washington, D.C., as part of the National Statuary Hall Collection. The statue was gifted by the U.S. state of Pennsylvania in 1889.

See also
 1889 in art

References

External links
 

1889 establishments in Washington, D.C.
1889 sculptures
Marble sculptures in Washington, D.C.
Monuments and memorials in Washington, D.C.
Fulton, Robert
Sculptures of men in Washington, D.C.